Radlice may refer to the following places:
 Radlice (Prague), Czech Republic
 Radlice, Pyrzyce County, Poland
 Radlice, Choszczno County, Poland

See also